Alejandro Benítez Palomero (born 15 May 2000) is a Spanish footballer who plays as a right back for Algeciras CF.

Club career
Benítez was born in Mijas, Málaga, Andalusia, and joined Málaga CF's youth setup in 2013, aged 13. He made his senior debut with the reserves on 26 August 2018, starting in a 0–1 Segunda División B home loss against San Fernando CD.

Definitely promoted to the B-team for the 2019–20 season, Benítez scored his first senior goal on 5 January 2020, netting the opener in a 2–1 home win against Atlético Mancha Real. He made his first team debut on 13 September, starting in a 0–2 loss at CD Tenerife in the Segunda División championship.

On 1 July 2022, free agent Benítez signed a two-year contract with Algeciras CF in Primera Federación.

References

External links
Málaga profile 

2000 births
Living people
Sportspeople from the Province of Málaga
Spanish footballers
Footballers from Andalusia
Association football defenders
Segunda División players
Segunda División B players
Tercera División players
Atlético Malagueño players
Málaga CF players
Algeciras CF footballers